Manzo Iwata (9 February 1924 – 4 June 1993) was a Japanese martial artist.

Life and career

Early years
Manzo Iwata was born in Tokyo, Japan, to a family that owned the Iwata-en Tea Company. He began the study of Shito-ryu karate at the age of 10. In junior high school, he also studied judo and kendo. He studied aikido with Ueshiba Morihei, the founder of aikido and a good friend of his grandfather. Iwata enrolled at Toyo University in 1941 and began training in karate directly under Grandmaster Kenwa Mabuni, the founder of Shito-ryu karate. After beginning training in Kobudo Bujutsu or staff, Iwata was advised by Mabuni to study Jojutsu, or short staff, under Seiko Fujita. In 1943, Iwata received a Jojutsu Shihan diploma from Fujita. After graduating from Toyo University in 1944, Iwata also received a Shihan diploma from Mabuni. After the death of Fujita in 1966, Iwata became heir to many of his styles, but not of Kōga-ryū Wada Ha Ninjutsu.

Later years
In 1960, Iwata established the Nihon Karate-Do Kai Eastern Japan and became its first president. In 1964, he became vice-president of the All Japan Karate-Do Federation Shito-Kai. In 1969, he became the Saitama Prefecture Karate-Do Federation vice-president. In 1972, he became an All Japan Karate-do Federation first grade referee. In 1980, he became the president of Shito-Kai, and in 1993 received the Japan Martial Arts Distinguished Service Medal. He died of heart failure in 1993.

References

1924 births
1993 deaths
Shitō-ryū practitioners
Japanese male karateka
People from Tokyo